The Diocese of Nashville is a Latin Church ecclesiastical territory or diocese of the Catholic Church that encompasses 38 counties spread over 16,302 square miles of Middle Tennessee. The Catholic population of the diocese is estimated at approximately 76,000 individuals registered in parishes, which represents about 3.4% of the overall population in Middle Tennessee. , Mass was offered in Spanish, Vietnamese, Latin, and Korean. The diocese has 75 priests and 70 permanent deacons serving 59 churches. There are 24 seminarians currently studying for the priesthood.  The Cathedral Church of the Incarnation, located on West End Avenue in Nashville, close to the Vanderbilt University campus is the present seat of the Bishop of Nashville.

The majority of the membership lives in Nashville and surrounding suburbs. However, some parishes outside that area have seen considerable growth in recent times due to the influx of Hispanic immigrants settling in some smaller communities; sometimes, so the Spanish-speaking members outnumber English-speaking communicants in such churches. Services are often said in English by one priest and then in Spanish by a second priest. It is common to have three or more services each weekend. The Diocese of Nashville is a suffragan diocese in the ecclesiastical province of the metropolitan Archdiocese of Louisville.

History
Pope Gregory XVI erected the Diocese of Nashville on 28 July 1837, taking the territory of the present state of Tennessee from the Diocese of Bardstown and making it a suffragan of the Archdiocese of Baltimore.  Holy Rosary Cathedral, located where the Tennessee State Capitol now stands, became the first cathedral of the diocese.

Bishop Richard Pius Miles, the first Bishop of Nashville, built the Church of Saint Mary of the Seven Sorrows, located downtown near the state capital, as the second cathedral of the diocese.  It became a parish church when the present cathedral opened in 1914.

On 9 December 1937, Pope Pius XI transferred the diocese to the new Metropolitan Province of Louisville.

On 20 June 1970, Pope Paul VI created the new Diocese of Memphis, taking the counties of Tennessee west of the Tennessee River from the diocese.

On 27 May 1988, Pope John Paul II created the Diocese of Knoxville, taking the eastern counties of Tennessee from the diocese and thus establishing its present territory.

A study released in 2014 by the Center for Applied Research in the Apostolate (CARA) at Georgetown University cited the Diocese of Nashville as having the 8th highest rate of conversions to the Catholic Church.

Sexual abuse cases 
The Diocese of Nashville has had a few sexual abuse scandals, several of which came to light in the early 2000s after the investigation of the Roman Catholic Archdiocese of Boston. In 2003, allegations began to surface that Father Ryan High School principal Ronald Dickman had been forced to resign in 1987 due to reports of molesting two students. Mark Cunningham, a local Catholic businessman, reported that he had alerted Father Giacosa in 1991 that Mark Cunningham's late brother John Cunningham Jr., had been molested by Ronald Dickman. In 1991, Ronald Dickman left the priesthood, and in 1992 left his job as executive director of Nashville's Crisis Intervention Center after officials at the center received multiple reports that Ronald Dickman had molested children. In taped conversations between Mark Cunningham and Nashville Diocese attorney Gino Marchetti, Gino Marchetti refused to acknowledge that Ronald Dickman was removed from the priesthood due to the allegation of molestation but admitted: "Now you don't have to be a damn rocket scientist to figure out somebody who has been in the priesthood for, you know, whatever, 20 years - that, you know, somebody comes in August or September of '91 and then December 1, '91 he, quote, leaves the priesthood, unquote. ... I mean, like I said, it doesn't take a rocket scientist to figure out." After Mark Cunningham released recordings of his conversations to The Tennessean, Rick Musacchio (a spokesman for the Nashville Diocese) conceded in January 2003 that "Gino only acknowledged to Mark that a conversation between Mark and Father Giacosa took place in 1991 and that someone might draw a conclusion that there was a connection between that meeting with Giacosa and Dickman's departure from the priesthood. However, any inference that this conversation confirms an allegation of the sexual abuse of a minor is simply incorrect." Another Father Ryan alumnus, David Brown, came forward in 2005 (when the Diocese of Nashville released victims from confidentiality agreements) with allegations that former biology teacher Rev. Paul Frederick Haas had molested children at Father Ryan in the 1960s before his transfer to Kentucky. Brown had initially alerted the Nashville Diocese in 1996, but the Nashville Diocese induced him to settle the case after Bishop Kmiec told him: "Yours is an isolated case... We don't know of any others."

In 2011, a controversy arose over the naming of the diocese's football stadium at Father Ryan High School after former teacher Father Charles Giacosa, who bequeathed approximately $1 million for the construction of the stadium. Father Ryan alumnus and local businessman Charles Michael Coode, who also claimed that he was abused by a former Father Ryan priest in 1953 before Father Giacosa's tenure, wrote letters to the Father Ryan Board of Trustees criticizing the decision to honor Father Giacosa. As detailed in an opinion of the Tennessee Supreme Court reversing a grant of summary judgment to the Roman Catholic Diocese of Nashville, Father Giacosa and Bishop Niedergeses were aware in 1986 that Father McKeown "had sexual contact with approximately thirty boys over the past 14 years." The Nashville Diocese sent Father McKeown to in-patient treatment at the Institute of Living in Hartford, Connecticut, from October 1986-March 1987. Father Giacosa and Bishop Niedergeses transferred Father McKeown back to Nashville in the spring of 1987. "Although the Diocese putatively forbade McKeown's access to youth, ... McKeown heard children's confessions, participated openly in various Diocesan youth activities including overnight, 'lock-ins," and spent time individually with minor boys with whom he had made contact through the Diocese... The record also indicates that Bishop Niedergeses and Father Giacosa became aware of some if not all of these activities no later than February 1989." Father Giacosa and Bishop Niedergeses finally took action because, according to their notes from a meeting in 1988 with Father McKeown, they "worried about the Diocese being exposed in sensationalistic news television." Father Giacosa's notes from that meeting were labeled "'Top Secrecy' 'Could hurt your church'" and indicated that "they wanted the Diocese to avoid financial liability for his sexual misconduct." Father Giacosa and Bishop Niedergeses finally induced McKeown to depart from Diocese property in 1989 after McKeown presented a minor boy with a condom at a Christmas party, but the Diocese continued to pay McKeown until early 1994. According to the Tennessee Supreme Court, "[i]n 1995 Bishop Kmiec, Bishop Niedergeses' successor, became aware that a parent in Knoxville alleged that McKeown had molested her son several years earlier." From 1995 to 1999 McKeown sexually abused two minor boys whom he often accompanied "on the sidelines during football games at a Diocesan high school." Finally, after years of the Nashville Diocese's failure to report Father McKeown, he was convicted in 1999 after the two boys and their parents reported the abuse to the Metropolitan Nashville Police Department and eventually died in prison in 2018.

On February 28, 2020, the Diocese of Nashville unveiled the names of 25 Catholic clergy who were accused of committing acts of sex abuse while serving in the Diocese of Nashville. Many are deceased and none are still remaining in active ministry.

In July 2020, it was revealed that an adult female student at Aquinas College claimed that Diocese priest Father Kevin McGoldrick sexually assaulted her in 2017 and the Diocese of Nashville refused to investigate her allegation after she reported it to the Diocese in 2019. McGoldrick previously served as chaplain of Nashville's Dominican campus, which the Aquinas College is a part of. He served the Dominican campus from August of 2013 until June of 2019. After the allegation was reported, the Diocese of Nashville refused to not only open a formal investigation about the allegation, but also refused to report it to McGoldrick's home diocese, the Archdiocese of Philadelphia.

Bishops

Bishops of Nashville
The following is a list of bishops, along with their dates of service:
 Richard Pius Miles (1837–1860)
 James Whelan (1860–1864; coadjutor bishop 1859–1860)
 Patrick Feehan (1865–1880), appointed Bishop and later Archbishop of Chicago
 Joseph Rademacher (1883–1893), appointed Bishop of Fort Wayne
 Thomas Sebastian Byrne (1894–1923)
 Alphonse John Smith (1923–1935)
 William Lawrence Adrian (1936–1969)
 Joseph Aloysius Durick (1969–1975; coadjutor bishop 1963–1969)
 James Daniel Niedergeses (1975–1992)
 Edward Urban Kmiec (1992–2004), appointed Bishop of Buffalo
 David Raymond Choby (2005–2017)
 J. Mark Spalding (2018–present)

Other priests of this diocese who became bishops
Richard Scannell, appointed Bishop of Concordia in 1887 and later Bishop of Omaha
John Baptist Morris, appointed Coadjutor Bishop (in 1906) and later Bishop of Little Rock
John Patrick Farrelly, appointed Bishop of Cleveland in 1909
Samuel Alphonsus Stritch, appointed Bishop of Toledo in 1921 and later Archbishop of Milwaukee, Archbishop of Chicago, and Pro-Prefect of the Sacred Congregation for the Propagation of the Faith (elevated to Cardinal in 1946)
Fernand J. Cheri, appointed Auxiliary Bishop of New Orleans in 2015

Catholic education

High schools
 Father Ryan High School, Nashville
 Pope John Paul II High School, Hendersonville
 St. Cecilia Academy, Nashville

Colleges
 Aquinas College, Nashville (run by the Dominican Sisters of St. Cecilia)

See also

 List of the Catholic dioceses of the United States

References

External links
official website

 
1837 establishments in Tennessee
Catholic Church in Tennessee
Christianity in Tennessee
Nashville
Nashville
Nashville
Roman Catholic Ecclesiastical Province of Louisville
Organizations based in Nashville, Tennessee